The Delaware Water Gap is a proposed rail station in Smithfield Township, Monroe County, Pennsylvania, as part of the Lackawanna Cut-Off Restoration Project. Passenger rail service into New Jersey and New York City would be provided by NJ Transit or Amtrak via the Lackawanna Cut-Off.

Parking would be available at the Pennsylvania welcome center, located southwest of Interstate 80. The Commonwealth of Pennsylvania recently completed improvements to the welcome center. A park-and-ride facility, a five-level garage with about 900 spaces, would be built in the current parking area. The amount of parking for the welcome center would remain unchanged. 

Pedestrians would walk between the station platform, located between the track and Interstate 80, and the parking site via River Road (Route 2028), which would be improved to handle the foot traffic. Cars coming from Interstate 80 would also use River Road.

The proposed location is just outside Delaware Water Gap National Recreation Area.

See also
Lackawanna Cut-Off

References

External links
 Lackawanna Cut-Off map

Proposed NJ Transit rail stations
Railway stations in Pennsylvania
Proposed public transportation in New Jersey
Transportation buildings and structures in Monroe County, Pennsylvania